Recipe for Hate is the seventh studio album by American punk rock band Bad Religion, released on June 4, 1993. It was their last album on Epitaph Records for nine years (until 2002's The Process of Belief) and the band had switched to Atlantic Records, who re-released the album several months after its release.

While the album was reissued on a major label, Recipe for Hate initially received mixed reviews from music critics. It was also the first Bad Religion album to chart in the U.S., debuting at #14 on Billboard's Heatseekers chart, with "American Jesus" and "Struck a Nerve" in particular becoming major rock radio hits. The album also contains significant songs like, "Recipe for Hate" and "Skyscraper", which are both fan favorites and are staples of their live show today; the former is a song that Bad Religion often opens their set with.

Album cover

The album cover features an image of two dog-faced humans. It is an original photo collage – using the bodies of 1930s Southern racists mocking the press after their acquittal by an all-white jury for murder, and 1944 Nazi Auschwitz-Birkenau concentration camp guard dog heads. This is a metaphor for how far hate can spread. Hate by simple conversation that escalates – soon becoming the norm in culture (Artist). The artwork was designed by Fred Hidalgo (known for drawing the cover for the Offspring's highly acclaimed 1994 album Smash, which was also released on Epitaph). Recipe for Hate was the first Bad Religion album since 1988's Suffer to display the Friz Quadrata font on the cover; the band would use this font again on their subsequent albums (except for The Process of Belief and The Empire Strikes First).

Musical style
The album finds Bad Religion continuing the experimentation of its predecessor, Generator, introducing elements of country and folk on songs like "Man with a Mission", and "Struck a Nerve", the latter of which includes a guest vocal by Johnette Napolitano (of Concrete Blonde). "Man with a Mission" featured a slide guitar part over a standard punk guitar "gallop".

Production and marketing
Like Bad Religion's albums up to Generator, Recipe for Hate was recorded at Westbeach Recorders in Hollywood, California, in 1993. This was the last time they would record an album there, until 2002's The Process of Belief.

During the recording of the album, Johnette Napolitano (of Concrete Blonde) and Eddie Vedder (of Pearl Jam) were invited to the studio to provide backing vocals on some of the songs. Napolitano's backing vocals can be heard on "Struck a Nerve", where she provides backing vocals on the bridge and in the last chorus. Vedder also provided backing vocals on "American Jesus" and sings the second verse of "Watch It Die".

Final overdubs and mixing were done at Brooklyn Recording Studios in Los Angeles, CA. The car used in "Stealth" was Brett Gurewitz's car, and recorded just outside the studio in the parking lot. One or two songs were remixed at a different studio after the Brooklyn Recording sessions.

Release and reception

Recipe for Hate was released on June 4, 1993, and became the last Bad Religion album distributed via Epitaph Records before their return to the label in 2001. Not long after its release, Bad Religion was signed to Atlantic Records, who quickly reissued the album. Although Recipe for Hate did not chart on the Billboard 200, it peaked at number 14 on Billboard's Heatseekers chart. The singles "American Jesus" and "Struck a Nerve" also did not chart, but earned airplay on MTV.

Recipe for Hate received generally mixed to positive reviews from most music critics. Allmusic reviewer Jack Rabid gave the album a rating of three-and-a-half stars out of five and states: "It's easy to take them for granted, to view Recipe as just another red-hot LP (ho hum) by the last and best band to survive the '80s L.A. punk explosion. And on first listen, it's tarnished by their previous mild malaise: everything sounds alike, and some exit the boat here too quickly. But then the beautiful sonic smack starts to sink in, and the luxurious melodies introduce erudite parables."

Unlike Bad Religion's previous albums (except Into the Unknown), Recipe for Hate has never been remastered, or reissued on CD or cassette since Atlantic re-released the album in 1993. It has, however, been reissued on vinyl twice (in 2009 and 2015), and was included in the 2010 vinyl box set 30 Years of Bad Religion, containing reissues of all the band's albums up to The Dissent of Man.

Track listing

 "Skyscraper" is misspelled as "Sky Skraper" on the CD, but spelled correctly on the back cover and in the booklet.

Personnel
 Greg Graffin – vocals
 Brett Gurewitz – guitar, backing vocals
 Greg Hetson – guitar
 Jay Bentley – bass guitar, backing vocals
 Bobby Schayer – drums
 Eddie Vedder of Pearl Jam – guest vocals on "American Jesus" and "Watch It Die"
 Johnette Napolitano of Concrete Blonde – guest vocals on "Struck a Nerve"
 John Wahl – guitar on "Kerosene"
 Chris Bagarozzi – guitar on "Kerosene"
 Greg Leisz - Slide guitar on "Man with a Mission"
 Joe Peccerillo - Lead guitar on "All Good Soldiers", assistant engineering
 Paul Dugre - engineering
 Donnell Cameron - engineering
 Scott Stillman - assistant engineering
 Alison Dyer - photography
 Doug Sax – mastering
 Frederico Carlo mel Hidalgo – art direction

References

External links

Recipe for Hate at YouTube (streamed copy where licensed)

Bad Religion albums
1993 albums
Epitaph Records albums
Atlantic Records albums
Alternative rock albums by American artists